Olympia 52 is a 1952 French documentary film about the 1952 Summer Olympics in Helsinki, Finland. Olympia 52 was produced by Peuple et Culture, a nonprofit organization, and it was the first feature-length work directed by the French filmmaker Chris Marker, who also co-wrote the narrative and served as one of the production's four cinematographers.

References

External links
 

1952 films
Films about the 1952 Summer Olympics
French black-and-white films
Documentary films about the Olympics
Films directed by Chris Marker
French documentary films
1950s French-language films
1952 documentary films
1950s French films